Slum clearance in the United States has been used as an urban renewal strategy to regenerate derelict or run-down districts, often to be replaced with alternative developments or new housing. Early calls were made during the 19th century, although mass slum clearance did not occur until after World War II with the introduction of the Housing Act of 1949 which offered federal subsidies towards redevelopments. The scheme ended in 1974 having driven over 2,000 projects with costs in excess of $50 billion.

Background

Contemporary slums have been dated back to population growth in industrial cities during the Industrial Revolution, where workers would crowd into subdivided or makeshift dwellings because no new housing was available. Congress authorized $20,000 for a survey of large city slum conditions in 1892, although did not take any action until the final year of the Hoover administration in 1932.

The definition of a slum was classed by the Federal Housing Act of 1937 as "any area where dwellings predominate which, by reason of dilapidation, overcrowding, faulty arrangements or design, lack of ventilation, light or sanitation facilities, or any combination of these factors, are detrimental to safety, health or morals".

Clearance programs garnered some criticism, particularly at the lack of attention given to the potential of regenerating existing structures deemed to be dilapidated. Some slums may have been viable for inexpensively cleaning up through use of stricter safety and sanitation enforcement. In the mid 20th century, a housing court was established in Baltimore with the power to impose penalties for violations of agreed codes of practice, which in turn helped to regenerate around 16,000 slum properties.

Obstacles

The Housing Act of 1949 offered federal subsidies to local redevelopment projects, allowing local agencies to clear and sell blighted land for redevelopment, up to a limit of $808 million per year. Federal subsidies helped alleviate potential hurdles in acquiring land with high purchase costs. In some cases, cities were unwilling to progress with slum clearance unless significant amounts of the original upfront cost could be reclaimed by sale of the improved land. Estimates from the National Association of Home Builders suggested that subsidies authorized to the maximum amount could have cost in excess of $12 billion.

The act was hindered by defensive priorities, with clearance grants deferred if the project was not consistent with defense requirements. Clearance of slum and blighted areas could be justified as serving the defensive effort as these areas were considered the most vulnerable in the event of enemy attack. In 1951, 32 cities and towns surveyed indicated that much of their cleared land was to be reused for private residential developments, with some public housing also included.

Some slum clearance projects suffered delays as a result of local resident hostility towards clearance and forced migration. In some neighborhoods, foreign-born and minority ethnic residents occupied some of the worst city center housing, yet they feared moving away from their own language and cultural groups. African Americans in particular felt strongly that their areas and houses were targeted for urban renewal through means of ethnic cleansing and that they would be classed as the "wrong" type of people to be living in the city, helpless to prevent it without proper policy or controls in place.

20th century

Between 1932 and 1952, eradication of slums was federally supported, yet nearly every city still contained neighborhoods with derelict or unsafe housing. The Emergency Relief and Construction Act of 1932 approved slum clearance loans and new low-rent housing, yet New York City was the only place where development occurred under the act. In 1933, the act was replaced with the National Industrial Recovery Act which focused on slum clearance and home construction for low-income families and produced nearly 60 projects that built around 24,500 new houses. The first federal slum clearance program was proposed by President Franklin D. Roosevelt in 1933, citing the high cost of land as the primary reason for government intervention. In 1949, the Senate Banking and Currency Committee stated in its report that 1 in 5 urban families lived in slum conditions. Federal law required cities to relocate displaced residents in safe and sanitary permanent residences prior to demolition of their slum home, with priority for available public housing. A report in 1950 suggested that over 6 million dwellings, representing around 20% of all city housing, did not meet minimum sanitation standards.

Following World War II, housing issues became top of the domestic policy agenda, including the eradication of slums. Congress in 1949 approved the Housing and Home Finance Agency to offer local assistance with renewal projects with grants between 66 and 75% of the project cost. In some cities, slums were cleared solely for aesthetic reasons with little regard for those displaced. Despite 6.5 million new housing units built between 1945 and 1952, some cities saw an expansion in slum areas.

While slum clearance did not feature prominently during the 1952 presidential election, President-elect Dwight D. Eisenhower referred to the requirement of having decent housing for Americans forced to live in slums as a "moral obligation". In 1957, Congress began planning for new legislation that would help to clear slum areas, having authorized the federal government to provide $1.25 billion of funding since 1949 to cities for regeneration or demolition of run-down neighborhoods. States that were promised funding included $143 million for New York, $83 million for Illinois and nearly $29 million for Massachusetts. Some states, such as Florida, Mississippi and South Carolina, did not pass laws that would have allowed their communities to participate in slum clearance schemes. The Eisenhower administration intended to reduce the budget for the Urban Renewal Program from $250 million to $175 million for the 1958 fiscal year, however following protests from city mayors across the country, Congress ultimately chose to increase the budget to $350 million.

As of June 1966, projects which had gained approval had clearance intended or completed for over 400,000 houses, displacing over 300,000 families. Within the clearance areas, 35% was proposed for residential redevelopment while just over a quarter was reserved for streets and footpaths. Although initially starting with wide political support, it became controversial over time. Federally subsidized clearances ended in 1974, after funding over 2,000 renewal projects at a cost of around $50 billion.

Redevelopments

Proposals for slum clearance came as early as the 1820s in relation to the Five Points neighborhood in Lower Manhattan, New York City. Efforts towards the late 19th century were successful in razing the Mulberry Bend area, then deemed to be one of the most blighted sections of the neighborhood.

Mar Vista Gardens is a housing project completed in 1954 built on an abandoned celery field. Construction paused in the early 1950s when a 6.4 acre strip of land was discovered to be county territory and was annexed in 1952 as part of slum clearance measures. Manhattanville Houses is a public housing project built during the late 1950s on slum clearance land formerly occupied by tenement blocks.

See also

 Subsidized housing in the United States
 Slum clearance in the United Kingdom
 Slum clearance in India

Notes and references

 

Slum clearance
Housing in the United States